Leonard William Fraser (April 1, 1902 – September 18, 1957) was a lawyer and political figure in Nova Scotia, Canada. He represented Cumberland County in the Nova Scotia House of Assembly from 1940 to 1941 as a Conservative member.

He was born in Amherst, Nova Scotia, the son of Robert McGregor Fraser. Fraser was educated at Dalhousie University. He married Kathleen Blanchet. Fraser was leader of the Opposition in the provincial assembly in 1941. He died in Halifax at the age of 55.

References 
 A Directory of the Members of the Legislative Assembly of Nova Scotia, 1758-1958, Public Archives of Nova Scotia (1958)

1902 births
1957 deaths
Progressive Conservative Association of Nova Scotia MLAs
Dalhousie University alumni
Nova Scotia political party leaders